Killian Collins (born 11 April 1978) is an Irish former yacht racer who competed in the 2004 Summer Olympics. Collins now has a career in storage engineering at EMC.

References

1978 births
Living people
Irish male sailors (sport)
Olympic sailors of Ireland
Sailors at the 2004 Summer Olympics – Star